The City of Edmonton has experienced a series of municipal boundary adjustments over its history since originally incorporating as a town in 1892 through incorporation as a city, amalgamation or annexation of other urban municipalities, annexation of rural lands from its surrounding neighbours, and separation of lands back to its rural neighbours. Its most recent annexations, which came into effect on January 1, 2019, involved acquisition of lands from predominantly Leduc County as well as Beaumont and Sturgeon County.

Early 20th century 
The first private buildings outside the walls of Fort Edmonton date from around 1871 when Reverend George McDougall bought a plot from the Hudson's Bay Company (HBC) to found the first Methodist church. Edmonton was created as a separate settlement from Fort Edmonton by the HBC on October 29, 1881.  Edmonton was incorporated as a town in 1892 and became a city in 1904.

On May 13, 1912, the HBC put the  Hudson's Bay Company Reserve on the market, prompting a land rush. The reserve occupied the land between what is today 101 Street to the east and 121 Street to the west, the North Saskatchewan River to the south and 122 Avenue to the north. The portion of the reserve south of 109 Avenue was included within the Edmonton's boundaries when it was originally incorporated as a town on January 1, 1892. The next portion to the north, south of 118 Avenue, was included within Edmonton's boundaries when it incorporated as a city on October 8, 1904. The final portion of the reserve south of 122 Avenue was annexed into the city on May 8, 1908 along with other lands to the north, east and southwest.

Strathcona 
The City of Edmonton and the City of Strathcona, formerly called South Edmonton and which now includes the Old Strathcona district and surrounding neighbourhoods, officially amalgamated to become one city on February 12, 1912. Strathcona had a population of 5,579 in the 1911 Canadian census. The merger followed a plebiscite held in both cities in which 518 Edmontonians voted in favour of the amalgamation (74%) and 178 voted against (26%), while 667 Strathcona residents voted in favour (87%) and 96 against (13%). Edmonton's plebiscite, held on September 27, 1911, asked "Are you in favour of amalgamation of the Cities of Edmonton and Strathcona upon terms set out in Schedule A to Bylaw 356 of the City of Edmonton?" The new city council was elected February 16, 1912.

North Edmonton
The Village of North Edmonton was incorporated on January 20, 1910, encompassing four quarter sections of land. It had a population of 404 in the 1911 Canadian census. The village was subsequently annexed by Edmonton on July 22, 1912.

Village of West Edmonton (Calder) 
In 1917 Edmonton annexed the Village of West Edmonton, also known as Calder, which had formerly sat on the northwest edge of the HBC reserve.

Beverly 
In 1956, a royal commission recommended that the towns of Beverly, on Edmonton's eastern border, and Jasper Place, on Edmonton's western border, as well as portions of surrounding rural municipalities, amalgamate with Edmonton. In 1961, residents of Beverly cast ballots in a referendum regarding amalgamation with Edmonton in which 62% voted in favour. The Town of Beverly (and its 9,041 citizens) and surrounding lands were subsequently absorbed by Edmonton on December 30, 1961, with Edmonton assuming the town's $4.16 million debt (equivalent to $ million in )

Jasper Place and Sherwood Park 
The City of Edmonton initiated a major annexation application in 1962 to absorb the Town of Jasper Place and portions of the Municipal District (MD) of Stony Plain No. 84 to the west. That same year, the Jasper Place Town Council moved to amalgamate into Edmonton, with a plebiscite held on October 17, 1962, in which a majority of residents voted in favour of amalgamation. The City of Edmonton's application also proposed to annex a significant amount of the County of Strathcona No. 20 to the south, southeast and east, including industrial lands and Sherwood Park.

The decision rendered by the Local Authorities Board in 1964 granted annexation of Jasper Place and the majority of lands sought from the MD of Stony Plain No. 84. The decision also enabled annexation of lands from the County of Strathcona No. 20 to the southeast and south, but annexation of Sherwood Park and industrial areas to the east were not approved.

Amalgamation occurred on August 17, 1964, and included Edmonton assuming Jasper Place's $8.18 million debt (equivalent to $ million in ), which Jasper Place had borrowed to keep pace with the infrastructure investments for what was then the largest town in Canada, with a population of 37,429an increase of 950% from when it was an unincorporated hamlet in 1948.

Mill Woods 
In the 1960s Edmonton expanded south onto farmland that had once been part of the Papaschase Cree Indian Reserve to create what is now Mill Woods. The descendants of the inhabitants of this reserve believe their ancestors were cheated out of the land. A legal challenge launched by the descendants in 2004 was summarily dismissed by the Court of Queen's Bench of Alberta; the judge found that the majority of the plaintiffs' claims had little merit. After several appeals, a subsequent challenge was taken to the Supreme Court of Canada in 2008, which re-instated the 2004 decision.

St. Albert and Strathcona County 
On March 22, 1979, the City of Edmonton filed an application with the Local Authorities Board to annex all of the City of St. Albert and County of Strathcona No. 20, as well as parts of the County of Parkland No. 31 and the MD of Sturgeon No. 90. A majority of the proposed annexation was approved by the Local Authorities Board in 1980 (Order No. 14000), including the City of St. Albert and community of Sherwood Park, which concluded after 106 days of testimony, 299 exhibits, and 12,235 pages of transcripts. However the Cabinet of Premier Peter Lougheed nullified the order, and the proposed annexation was eventually rejected.

1982 general annexation 
Edmonton's largest annexation, referred to as the 1982 general annexation, came into effect on January 1, 1982, when lands were absorbed from the County of Parkland No. 31 to the west, the MD of Sturgeon No. 90 to the north, and the County of Strathcona No. 20 to the east and south. A portion of undeveloped land of the City of St. Albert to the northwest was also annexed. As part of the decision, additional lands were transferred from the MD of Sturgeon No. 90 to St. Albert, while the remaining  of the County of Strathcona No. 20 to the south of Edmonton was transferred to the County of Leduc No. 25.

1998 and 2002 adjustments 
Between 1982 and 2019, there were only been two minor adjustments to Edmonton's boundary. In 1998, a less than  portion of Whitemud Drive's approach to Anthony Henday Drive (then Highway 14) in southeast Edmonton was transferred to Strathcona County. Similarly, a less than  piece of land along St. Albert Trail was transferred to St. Albert in 2002.

Leduc County and Beaumont 
A proposal to annex land from Leduc County, including the Edmonton International Airport, emerged in 2004 during Bill Smith's final term as mayor. A similar proposal resurfaced in 2008, which was reported to include the airport and a portion of the Nisku Industrial Park. The possibility of annexing land emerged again in October 2011, when Mayor Stephen Mandel indicated to the Edmonton Journal the city's need to work cooperatively with its neighbours, including Leduc County, to address Edmonton's future land needs.  Negotiations between Edmonton and Leduc County commenced in April 2012.

In November 2012, the Town of Beaumont unveiled a proposal to annex twenty-four quarter sections (560 ha) from Leduc County including twelve quarter sections to the north, eight to the west and four to the south. The area included eight of the twelve quarter sections previously identified for annexation by Beaumont. Two months later in May 2013, Beaumont amended its notice of intent to annex after consulting with the public and conducting negotiations with Leduc County, which changed the configuration and reduced the amount of quarter sections to its north. The amendment reduced the overlap from eight to five quarter sections. Nearly a year later, Edmonton expanded its notice of intent to annex in April 2015 to include lands adjacent to Beaumont's northern boundary, increasing the overlap from five to nine quarter sections. A merit hearing before the Municipal Government Board (MGB) was conducted in June 2016 on Beaumont's annexation application, after which the MGB recommended to the provincial government to approve the application. The provincial government approved Beaumont's annexation application in November 2016 with an effective date of January 1, 2017.

On November 30, 2016, Leduc County and Edmonton announced a framework for an agreement on Edmonton's annexation proposal, a week after the province's decision on Beaumont's application. The western portion of Edmonton's annexation area was reduced to exclude lands west of the EIA and south of Highway 19 as well as the EIA itself, though a potential remained to include the EIA upon further negotiations. The eastern portion of Edmonton's annexation area was reduced to exclude lands within the north part of Nisku Industrial Park and the lands recently annexed by Beaumont, though Mayor Don Iveson announced the City of Edmonton will now pursue annexation of the previously overlapping nine quarter sections from Beaumont.

Edmonton, Leduc County, and Beaumont reached an agreement in early 2018 to undertake intermunicipal planning, resulting in Edmonton dropping pursuit of the previously overlapping nine quarter sections from Beaumont.

Sturgeon County (66 Street) 
Edmonton Councillor Ed Gibbons referred to the possibility of annexing land from Sturgeon County to the north in November 2012. Edmonton subsequently submitted an application in September 2014 to annex  from Sturgeon County in the vicinity of 66 Street NW and 195 Avenue NW. The annexation would enable the City of Edmonton to acquire jurisdiction over the realigned 66 Street NW, which provides a direct link from Anthony Henday Drive to the Edmonton Energy and Technology Park. The road was realigned as a result of the construction of Anthony Henday Drive to the south. In late 2018, the annexation was approved by the Province of Alberta with an effective date of January 1, 2019.

St. Albert proposal 
Throughout, St. Albert has maintained that it would simply be more cost efficient for it to service and maintain this small area, as the fragments are adjacent to serviced St. Albert land, while the natural barrier of the Anthony Henday Drive would make it less efficient for Edmonton to extend utility and other services. The fragments are located in a small northwest section of the Anthony Henday transportation utility corridor, adjacent to the north side of Anthony Henday Drive, adjacent to the south side of St. Albert, east of Ray Gibbon Drive and to the west and south of 137 Avenue NW.

Other potential proposals 
In October 2013, the possibility of annexing lands to the west and northeast emerged to facilitate future industrial development.

List of boundary adjustments

List of localities annexed 
Through its various annexations, the following localities are now located in Edmonton.

Beverly
Big Lake Estates
Bissell
Campbell
Campbell Park
Cannell
Dunvegan Yards
Edmonton Industrial Airport
Ellerslie
Elmjay Industrial Park
Evergreen Trailer Park
Grosvenor Park
Horse Hill
Hurstwood
Jasper Place
Lambton Park
Maple Ridge Park
Mooncrest
North Edmonton
Oak Ridge Park
Oliver
Riverbend
St. Albert Trail
St. Paul Junction
Terrace Heights
Wernerville
Westview Village Trailer Park N.
Westview Village Trailer Park S.
Windermere Country Estates
Winterburn
Woodbend

References

External links
City of Edmonton - Annexation
Government of Alberta - Annexation Board Orders

Edmonton Metropolitan Region
History of Edmonton
Local government in Alberta
Mergers of administrative divisions in Canada